Ivo Begović (born 22 March 1993) is a Croatian water polo player. He is currently playing for VK Solaris. He is 6 ft 2 in (1.88 m) tall and weighs 238 lb (108 kg).

References

1993 births
Living people
Croatian male water polo players
Sportspeople from Dubrovnik